The Goose River is a river in Waldo County, Maine.

See also
List of rivers of Maine

References

Maine Streamflow Data from the USGS
Maine Watershed Data From Environmental Protection Agency

Penobscot Bay
Rivers of Waldo County, Maine